George Carter Buford, Jr.  (November 10, 1929 – October 11, 2011), known as Mojo Buford, was an American blues harmonica player best known for his work in Muddy Waters's band.

Biography 
Buford relocated from Hernando, Mississippi, to Memphis, Tennessee, in his youth, where he studied the blues. He relocated to Chicago in 1952, forming the Savage Boys, which eventually was known as the Muddy Waters, Jr. Band. They substituted for Waters at local nightclubs while he was touring.

Buford first played in Waters's backing band in 1959, replacing Little Walter, but in 1962 moved to Minneapolis to front his own band and to record albums. In Minneapolis he gained the nickname Mojo, because of audiences requesting him to perform his cover version of "Got My Mojo Working."  Buford returned to Waters's combo in 1967 for a year, replacing James Cotton. He had a longer tenure with Waters in the early 1970s and returned for the final time after Jerry Portnoy departed to form the Legendary Blues Band.

He also recorded for the Mr. Blues label. These recordings were later reissued by Rooster Blues, Blue Loon Records, and the British JSP label.

Buford died on October 11, 2011, at the age of 81, in Minneapolis, after a long hospitalization.

Discography 
Exciting Harmonica Sound of Mojo Buford, BluesRecordSoc, 1963
Mojo Buford's Chicago Blues Summit, Rooster Blues, 1979
State of the Blues Harp, JSP, 1989
Harpslinger, Blue Loon, 1993
Still Blowin' Strong (Blue Loon, 1996)
Home Is Where My Harps Is, Blue Loon, 1998
Champagne & Reefer, Fedora Records, 1999
Blues Ain't a Color, Kpnbeat, 2005
Mojo Workin’, Sundazed, 2020

With Otis Spann
The Bottom of the Blues (BluesWay, 1968)
With Muddy Waters
"Unk" in Funk (Chess, 1974)

See also 
List of Chicago blues musicians
List of harmonica blues musicians
List of harmonicists

References

External links 
[ Biography at Allmusic.com]

1929 births
2011 deaths
People from Hernando, Mississippi
American blues harmonica players
Harmonica blues musicians
Blues musicians from Mississippi
Musicians from Memphis, Tennessee
Musicians from Chicago
Musicians from Minneapolis